The following are lists of animation:

Lists of anime
Lists of animated films
Lists of animated television series
List of animated internet series
List of animated direct-to-video series